Amanda Ferguson (born 19 February 1967) is a British fencer. She competed in the women's team foil event at the 1992 Summer Olympics.

References

External links
 

1967 births
Living people
British female foil fencers
Olympic fencers of Great Britain
Fencers at the 1992 Summer Olympics
People from Droylsden